Shaikhzada Muhametzakirovich Babich (14 January 1895 – 28 March 1919) was a Bashkir and Tatar poet, writer and playwright. He is considered a classic author of Bashkir national literature. He was a member of the Bashkir national liberation movement, and a member of the Bashkir government (1917–1919).

Biography
Shaikhzada Muhametzakirovich Babich was born in the village of Asyanovo, in the Ufa Governorate of what was then the Russian Empire, on 14 January 1895. Asyonovo had historically been part of the Kuyukovoy Kanlinskoy canton (now Dyurtyulinsky District of Bashkortostan). He studied his primary education in his native village, in a madrasa directed by his father, Muhametzakir, with a Russian-appointed mullah from the Asyan mahallah. In 1910, he travelled the Kazakh Steppe and taught Kazakh children.

Between 1911 and 1916, Babich studied in the Galia madrasa in Ufa, and became deeply interested in literature during his studies. He participated in literary and musical circles, and published manuscripts in the madrasa publication Parlak. After graduation, he went to Troitsk to work as a teacher, a period during which he also worked for the magazine Akmulla.

Most of Babich's literary work was created in the Tatar language, and his works were published in Tatar magazines and newspapers. Babich began to write poetry in the Bashkir language in 1917.

He lived in Ufa for a short time during the summer of 1917, and then moved to Orenburg, where he worked for the satirical magazine Carmack.

Babich became more invested in the Bashkir liberation movement in the autumn of 1917, when he became member of a party for the Bashkir movement and worked as a secretary of the Bashkir Central Shuro, as well as working as the editor of the newspaper Bashkort, and head of the youth organization of the Bashkirs, Тулҡын (meaning "Wave").

He worked as a war correspondent in 1918–1919, following Bashkir troops into combat.

He only published one book in his lifetime, a collection of poems entitled Blue Songs, Young Bashkortostan, released in 1918 in Orenburg.

On 25 February 1919, he was appointed an employee of the department of the Bashkir Soviet press Bashrevkoma.

On 28 March 1919, during the transition of the Bashkir Army to the Red Army, Shaikhzada Babich was brutally murdered by a member of the Red Army in the village of Zilair Zilairsky District, in what had become the Bashkir Autonomous Soviet Socialist Republic. He was only 24 years old.

Works
 Ballad "Bug" (1916)
 The poem "Gazaz" (1916)
 The cycle of epigrams "Kitabennas"

Citations
 Şiğirlär. X. Ğosman kereş süze.— Qazan: Tatkitap näşr., 1958. - 155 b.
 Haylanma äśärźär. - Öfö 1958.
 In Russian translation: Selected poems. - Ufa 1966.

References

Links
 , priuchrochenny the Third World Kurultay of Bashkirs
 article in Bashkortostan: a brief encyclopedia
 Статья в Башкирской энциклопедии 
 Ravil Bikbau. "Winged Babic"
 Poems S. Babic (translated into Russian)
 S. Babic. The poem "Bashkortostan" (translated into Russian)
 Pedigree Shaikhzada Babich
 Asyanovo village — the birthplace of the poet
 Decree / Farman number 1 / Bashkir Central Council / Shuro / Everything Bashkir people, Bashkir district and county councils, Orenburg, Caravanserai November 1917]

1895 births
1919 deaths
Bashkir writers
Tatar poets
Bashkir-language poets
Poets from the Russian Empire